The World University Squash Championship is the official international college competition in the game of squash conducted by the World Squash Federation (WSF), which was first held in 1996 in Maastricht in Netherlands.

Results

Medal table

See also
World Squash Federation
International University Sports Federation (FISU)
World Junior Squash Championships

References

External links
 World Squash Federation website
 FISU World University Championships website

 
Squash tournaments
Squash